The Nathaniel Drown House is a historic house located in Rehoboth, Massachusetts.

Description and history 
Built in about 1750, this two-story, wood-framed house is one of the best-preserved local examples of the once-common gambrel roof Georgian house. Its builder is unknown; its first documented owner was Nathaniel Drown, who owned it during the American Revolutionary War. The interior retains its original wood paneling, fireplaces, and flooring. The property also includes a c. 1840 barn and a mid-19th century carriage barn.

The house was listed on the National Register of Historic Places on June 6, 1983.

See also
National Register of Historic Places listings in Bristol County, Massachusetts

References

Houses in Bristol County, Massachusetts
Buildings and structures in Rehoboth, Massachusetts
Houses on the National Register of Historic Places in Bristol County, Massachusetts
Georgian architecture in Massachusetts